Nicolas Rabuel (born 15 January 1978) is a French football coach and a former defender. He is the manager of Valenciennes.

His previous clubs include Olympique Lyonnais, AS Angoulême, AS Nancy, Louhans-Cuiseaux, FC Rouen 1899, AS Cannes, Nîmes Olympique and US Boulogne.

Personal life
Rabuel is the father of Mattéo Rabuel, a footballer who he currently manages at Valenciennes.

References
General

Specific

Sportspeople from Bourg-en-Bresse
1978 births
Living people
French footballers
Olympique Lyonnais players
Angoulême Charente FC players
Louhans-Cuiseaux FC players
AS Nancy Lorraine players
FC Rouen players
AS Cannes players
Nîmes Olympique players
US Boulogne players
Ligue 1 players
Ligue 2 players
Association football defenders
Footballers from Auvergne-Rhône-Alpes
French football managers
Ligue 2 managers
Valenciennes FC managers